María Paula Elizondo Herrera (born 30 November 1998) is a Costa Rican footballer who plays as a defender for Deportivo Saprissa and the Costa Rica women's national team.

References

External links

1998 births
Living people
Women's association football defenders
Costa Rican women's footballers
People from Cartago Province
Costa Rica women's international footballers
Pan American Games bronze medalists for Costa Rica
Pan American Games medalists in football
Footballers at the 2019 Pan American Games
Deportivo Saprissa players
Medalists at the 2019 Pan American Games
21st-century Costa Rican women